Pac-Man is a 1992 EP by electronic music artist Richard D. James (Aphex Twin), released under the pseudonym Power-Pill. The tracks on the album are remixes of the musical themes in the Pac-Man and New Rally-X arcade games.

The tune consists, apart from a breakbeat and a few vocals, mainly of samples from the Pac-Man game.

Track listing

CD version

Vinyl version

References

External links
 , Pac-Man at xltronic.com

Pac-Man
Aphex Twin EPs
1992 EPs
PolyGram EPs
Breakbeat hardcore albums